Mette Hjermind Dencker (born 24 May 1978 in Odder) is a Danish politician, who is a member of the Folketing for the Danish People's Party. She was elected into parliament at the 2011 Danish general election.

Political career
Dencker has been in the municipal council of Hvidovre Municipality since 2006.

She was first elected into the Folketing in the 2011 general election, where she received 2,344 personal votes. She was reelected in the 2015 election with 6,218 personal votes, and again in the 2019 election with 2,348 personal votes.

External links 
 Biography on the website of the Danish Parliament (Folketinget)

References 

Living people
1978 births
People from Odder Municipality
21st-century Danish women politicians
Women members of the Folketing
Danish People's Party politicians
Danish municipal councillors
Members of the Folketing 2011–2015
Members of the Folketing 2015–2019
Members of the Folketing 2019–2022